Joseph Warren Merrill (December 13, 1819 – November 12, 1889) was a Massachusetts politician who served as the Mayor of Cambridge, Massachusetts. He also served as the Chair of the Colby College Board of Trustees from 1885 until his death in 1889.

Personal life 
J. Warren Merrill was born on December 13, 1819 in South Hampton, New Hampshire to Nathan and Sally (Page) Merrill. He married Hannah Brown Wattson in 1848, with whom he had two daughters and four sons. He died in Cambridge, Massachusetts on November 12, 1889.

Notes

1819 births
1889 deaths
Mayors of Cambridge, Massachusetts
Cambridge, Massachusetts City Council members
People from South Hampton, New Hampshire
19th-century American politicians